Eriogonum gracile is a species of wild buckwheat known by the common name slender woolly buckwheat.

Distribution
The annual plant is native to California, where it is widespread across the state except the deserts, and to parts of Baja California in northwestern Mexico.

It grows in many types of habitat, including chaparral, montane, woodland, and grasslands. It is often found on clay soils, and also in sandy places.

Distribution
Eriogonum gracile is an annual herb which is quite variable in appearance. It grows erect to decumbent with a slender, branching stem 10 to 70 centimeters long, sometimes with a thick coat of woolly fibers and sometimes nearly hairless.

The oblong leaves are borne on short petioles, the largest at the base of the plant with blades approaching 6 centimeters long. There are usually leaves along the lower part of the stem. The leaves are woolly in texture, at least on the undersides.

The flowering stem is lined with small clusters of hairless flowers in shades of pink, yellow, or white.

References

External links

Jepson Manual Treatment of Eriogonum gracile
Eriogonum gracile — U.C. Photo gallery

gracile
Flora of Baja California
Flora of California
Flora of the Cascade Range
Flora of the Great Basin
Flora of the Klamath Mountains
Flora of the Sierra Nevada (United States)
Natural history of the California chaparral and woodlands
Natural history of the California Coast Ranges
Natural history of the Central Valley (California)
Natural history of the Channel Islands of California
Natural history of the Peninsular Ranges
Natural history of the San Francisco Bay Area
Natural history of the Santa Monica Mountains
Natural history of the Transverse Ranges
Flora without expected TNC conservation status